Heteromicta poeodes is a species of snout moth in the genus Heteromicta. It was described by Alfred Jefferis Turner in 1905. It is found in Australia (including Queensland).

References

Moths described in 1905
Tirathabini